Wildcat is a wooden roller coaster located at Lake Compounce in Bristol, Connecticut. It was built in 1927 and is the park's centerpiece. It is one of the world's oldest roller coasters still in operation at the same location. It greatly resembles the now-defunct Wildcat roller coaster at Elitch Gardens Theme Park in Denver. Wildcat has received the American Coaster Enthusiasts (ACE) Coaster Landmark Award for its historical significance.

History
The Wildcat is a double out and back wooden coaster designed by Herbert Paul Schmeck and built by the Philadelphia Toboggan Company in 1927. Before the Wildcat was built, the Green Dragon Coaster used to stand in its place. In 1926, park owners Pierce and Norton contracted with the Philadelphia Toboggan Company for a new ride to replace the park's aging Green Dragon coaster. With the help of Herbert P. Schmeck, they created the Wildcat. The Wildcat featured a twister style layout including elements such as airtime and tunnels. The Wildcat's original trains were built by the Philadelphia Toboggan Company. The entire structure was rebuilt with new wood in 1985, and the last bunny hills were retracked in 2004. The Wildcat went down for refurbishment on September 17, 2006 and reopened for the 2007 operating season. During its refurbishment, the brake runs were completely removed and rebuilt with new magnetic brakes. The station also received air gates in the queue line and individual seat belts were added to each seat. In 2017, the ride got a full retracking by Martin & Vleminckx. The ride also got two new Millennium Flyer Trains made by Great Coasters International.

Wildcat Timeline
 1927: Opened to the Public
 1985: Reconstructed with new wood
 1998: Fully Retracked
 2004: Final bunny hill run retracked, Seat dividers installed
 2007: Magnetic brakes installed for ability of two train operation, Air gates added to queue, Individual seat belts installed, Most of the track was repainted, blue train repainted Purple, leaving the Wild Cat with one Red train and one Purple.
 2014(Pre-Season): Lift Motor Maintenance
 2012–2018: Full retracking, lift hill partially rebuilt, and two new Great Coasters International Millennium Flyer Trains

Ride experience
Wildcat sits in the center of Lake Compounce. Wildcat utilizes its design to twist around itself, while serving as the parks centerpiece. Once you leave the station the train turns slightly right and then left before climbing the 85-foot lift hill and dropping 73.7 feet. The lift hill is adjacent to the park entrance. The initial drop is followed by a left-banked curve and into a few more smaller hills until then reaching a right-banked curved leading into several more small hills. The train then curves right onto a section of bunny hills where it continues until it reaches the tunnel, where the brakes are. The ride is known for giving a rough ride.

References 

Roller coasters introduced in 1927
Roller coasters in Connecticut